Alfred Robinson (1887 – 1945) was an English professional footballer who played as a winger.

References

1887 births
1945 deaths
Footballers from Grimsby
English footballers
Association football wingers
St James F.C. players
Grimsby St John's F.C. players
Grimsby Rovers F.C. players
Grimsby Town F.C. players
Cleethorpes Town F.C. players
Immingham F.C. players
English Football League players